Conal Flood (born 1998) is an Irish hurler who plays for Wexford Championship club Cloughbawn and at inter-county level with the Wexford senior hurling team. He usually lines out as a wing-back.

Career

Born in Clonroche, County Wexford, Flood is the son of Seán Flood and the grandson of Tim Flood who both won All-Ireland Championship titles with Wexford. He first came to hurling prominence at juvenile and underage levels with the Cloughbawn club before eventually joining the club's top adult team. Flood first played at inter-county level during a two-year stint with the Wexford minor team. He was drafted onto the Wexford senior hurling team at the start of the 2018 season, however, a subsequent cruciate knee injury ruled him out of the game for a period.

Career statistics

References

1998 births
Living people
Cloughbawn hurlers
Wexford inter-county hurlers